The Ai River (also ; originally  and  in the Tang Dynasty) in Dangdong, Liaoning, China, is the largest tributary on the right (Chinese) side of the Yalu River that flows between China and North Korea. It starts in the mountains of Kuandian Manchu Autonomous County, runs  through Fengcheng City and Zhen'an District, and empties into the Yalu River at Jiulianshan, just south of the Hushan Great Wall.

References

Rivers of Liaoning
Dandong